Jeoffrey Pagan (born June 10, 1993) is a former American football defensive end. He was drafted by the Houston Texans in the sixth round of the 2014 NFL Draft. He played college football at Alabama, where he was a member of Alabama's 2011 and 2012 national championship teams.

College career

College statistics

In January 2014, Pagan announced his intention to forgo his senior year and enter the 2014 NFL Draft. He was ranked as one of the top defensive end prospects of his draft class.

Professional career

Pagan was selected by the Texans in the sixth round, 177th overall, in the 2014 NFL Draft.
On August 30, 2016, Pagan was waived by the Texans.

References

External links
Alabama Crimson Tide bio

1993 births
Living people
American football defensive ends
Alabama Crimson Tide football players
Players of American football from North Carolina
Sportspeople from Asheville, North Carolina
Houston Texans players